Vorona (lit. Crow) is the second studio album by the Russian ethno-rock singer Linda, released in 1996. The album has sold 1.5 million copies and took 3rd place in top best-selling albums in Russia in 1997."Vorona" had a great influence on popular culture and music of Russia. Music critics noted that the album became the top in the music career both of Linda and Maxim Fadeev. In November 2010 the album was included in the list of "50 best Russian albums of all time. Selection of young musicians" by the Afisha magazine.

Track listing

References

1996 albums
Linda (singer) albums